In cosmology, decoupling refers to a period in the development of the universe when different types of particles fall out of thermal equilibrium with each other. This occurs as a result of the expansion of the universe, as their interaction rates decrease (and mean free paths increase) up to this critical point. The two verified instances of decoupling since the Big Bang which are most often discussed are photon decoupling and neutrino decoupling, as these led to the cosmic microwave background and cosmic neutrino background, respectively.

Photon decoupling is closely related to recombination, which occurred about 378,000 years after the Big Bang (at a redshift of z = ), when the universe was a hot opaque ("foggy") plasma. During recombination, free electrons became bound to protons (hydrogen nuclei) to form neutral hydrogen atoms. Because direct recombinations to the ground state (lowest energy) of hydrogen are very inefficient, these hydrogen atoms generally form with the electrons in a high energy state, and the electrons quickly transition to their low energy state by emitting photons. Because the neutral hydrogen that formed was transparent to light, those photons which were not captured by other hydrogen atoms were able, for the first time in the history of the universe, to travel long distances. They can still be detected today, although they now appear as radio waves, and form the cosmic microwave background ("CMB"). They reveal crucial clues about how the universe formed.

Photon decoupling

Photon decoupling occurred during the epoch known as the recombination. During this time, electrons combined with protons to form hydrogen atoms, resulting in a sudden drop in free electron density. Decoupling occurred abruptly when the rate of Compton scattering of photons  was approximately equal to the rate of expansion of the universe ,  or alternatively when the mean free path of the photons  was approximately equal to the horizon size of the universe . After this photons were able to stream freely, producing the cosmic microwave background as we know it, and the universe became transparent.

The interaction rate of the photons is given by

In the matter-dominated era (when recombination takes place),

Neutrino decoupling

Another example is the neutrino decoupling which occurred within one second of the Big Bang. Analogous to the decoupling of photons, neutrinos decoupled when the rate of weak interactions between neutrinos and other forms of matter dropped below the rate of expansion of the universe, which produced a cosmic neutrino background of freely streaming neutrinos. An important consequence of neutrino decoupling is that the temperature of this neutrino background is lower than the temperature of the cosmic microwave background.

WIMPs: non-relativistic decoupling

Decoupling may also have occurred for the dark matter candidate, WIMPs. These are known as "cold relics", meaning they decoupled after they became non-relativistic (by comparison, photons and neutrinos decoupled while still relativistic and are known as "hot relics"). By calculating the hypothetical time and temperature of decoupling for non-relativistic WIMPs of a particular mass, it is possible to find their density. Comparing this to the measured density parameter of cold dark matter today of 0.222  0.0026  it is possible to rule out WIMPs of certain masses as reasonable dark matter candidates.

See also

Recombination
Chronology of the universe
Wouthuysen–Field coupling

References

Physical cosmology